Floors-2-Go was a wood flooring retailer in the United Kingdom, established in 1999. In 2012, the company's affiliates took over Allied Carpets in a pre-pack administration deal.

History

Floors-2-Go was founded in 1999 as a family business, with the first store opening in Birmingham. In 2004, the firm floated on the London Stock Exchange. This saw the firm evolving from cash-and-carry (wholesale)-type warehouses to retail superstores.

In 2005, Floors-2-Go opened its first stores in Northern Ireland. Later that year, the company announced plans to expand to around 350 stores.

In 2007, Floors-2-Go was sold for £52.4 million to its directors and private equity firm Alchemy Partners, at which point is ceased trading on the London Stock Exchange.

Administration
In 2008, the firm entered administration for the firs time, with its business hit by a slump in the housing market. The administrators, Kroll immediately closed 41 of the group's stores, which numbered 132 at the time. This resulted in 97 redundancies from a workforce of around 450 . 

The firm was saved but entered administration for a second time in 2011. Senate Recovery, the administrators, closed a further 53 stores, but retained 35.

In 2014, the business entered administration for the third time. MB Insolvency were appointed administrators, and made a further reduction in the number of stores and staff... However, the business re-entered administration the following year, this time with a jail threat to the brothers who owned the chain.

The company was eventually dissolved in 2017.

References

External links

 

1999 establishments in the United Kingdom
Companies that have entered administration in the United Kingdom
Companies formerly listed on the London Stock Exchange
Carpet retailers of the United Kingdom
Defunct retail companies of the United Kingdom
Retail companies established in 1999
Retail companies disestablished in 2017